The Marin Hills are a series of steep high ridges and peaks in southern Marin County. They are a part of the long Pacific Coast Ranges mountain system. The centerpoint of these hills is the 2,571 foot (784 m) Mount Tamalpais near Mill Valley. Parts of the hills are protected for their scenic beauty by Mount Tamalpais State Park and the Golden Gate National Recreation Area. The many ridges and peaks of these hills form a dramatic backdrop to the Golden Gate Bridge, the San Francisco skyline, and several towns around Richardson Bay when viewed from the south.

Climate
Since these hills lie near the Pacific Ocean, they force much of the incoming moisture out of the air and rainfall here is much greater than the bayside of Marin County. Due to this orographic rain effect, the Marin Municipal Water District has constructed several dams and reservoirs to store water for the population of Marin. The high rainfall also makes these hills conducive for Coast redwood and Douglas-fir. However, a side effect is that the eastern hills, where most of Marin's population lives, are drier and hotter due to the shielding of marine breezes. The low hills to the east support only California oak woodlands, chaparral and grasslands.

Landscape
The western part of the hills once had extensive old growth forests, but in the 1800s they were a source of timber for the San Francisco Bay Area, and thus logging took out most of the old growth stands; however, one old growth stand remained uncut in Sequoia Canyon, due to the steep terrain and it therefore withstood pressure from loggers and water companies. This stand is now the Muir Woods National Monument, part of the Golden Gate National Recreation Area. The parklands of these hills are popular with tourists and locals alike seeking to escape the urban areas of the Bay Area.

Fauna
The Black-tailed Deer is the most common large mammal of the Marin Hills.

References

Mountain ranges of Marin County, California
California Coast Ranges
California placenames of Native American origin
Mount Tamalpais
Mountain ranges of the San Francisco Bay Area
Mountain ranges of Northern California